François Prinsen (born 30 December 1905, date of death unknown) was a Belgian sprinter. He competed in the men's 200 metres at the 1928 Summer Olympics.

References

1905 births
Year of death missing
Athletes (track and field) at the 1928 Summer Olympics
Belgian male sprinters
Olympic athletes of Belgium
Place of birth missing